Saint Suitbert, Suidbert, Suitbertus, or Swithbert, a holy abbot venerated in the Roman Catholic Church and Eastern Orthodox Church, who lived in a monastery near the River Dacre, Cumberland, England, about forty years later, and is mentioned by the Venerable Bede. His liturgical feast is on April 30.

He is not to be confused with Suitbert of Kaiserswerth, another 7th century Anglo-Saxon Christian saint of the same name.

Sources

7th-century Christian saints
Anglo-Saxon saints